Nursel Köse (born 29 March 1961) is a Turkish-German actress. She studied and worked in Germany. Köse starred in the internationally acclaimed film The Edge of Heaven. She played Keriman Akçatepe in the TV series Paramparça.

Filmography

Film

Television

Books

 1996: Der Liebe zum Trotz / Sevdaya İnat – Poem
 1997: Hafızamda Oturuyorsun – Poem
 2000: Ütopya – Poem
 2000: WDR – Poem, Story

References

External links
 Official website
 

German people of Turkish descent
Living people
Best Supporting Actress Golden Orange Award winners
German film actresses
German television actresses
1961 births